Isaac Ntiamoah (born 27 October 1982) is an Australian track and field sprinter.

He was a member of the Australian 4 × 100 m relay team that equalled the Australian record when they qualified for the finals at the 2012 London Olympics. In the final the team finished sixth. Ntiamoah also took a fourth place in the relay at the 2010 Commonwealth Games.

References

External links
Profile at London2012.com
Profile  at Australian Olympic Team
Profile at Athletics Australia

1982 births
Living people
Sportspeople from Canberra
Australian male sprinters
Athletes (track and field) at the 2010 Commonwealth Games
Commonwealth Games competitors for Australia
World Athletics Championships athletes for Australia
Athletes (track and field) at the 2012 Summer Olympics
Olympic athletes of Australia